Nottinghamshire Fire and Rescue Service is the statutory fire and rescue service covering Nottinghamshire (including the unitary authority of Nottingham) in the East Midlands of England.

The City of Nottingham Fire Brigade and the Nottinghamshire Fire Brigade were created under the Fire Services Act 1947.

In 1974, the two brigades were merged. Since 1998 when Nottingham became a separate local government area, the service has been run by a joint fire authority made up of councillors from Nottingham City Council and Nottinghamshire County Council.

Performance
In 2018/2019, every fire and rescue service in England and Wales was subjected to a statutory inspection by Her Majesty's Inspectorate of Constabulary and Fire & Rescue Services (HIMCFRS). The inspection investigated how well the service performs in each of three areas. On a scale of outstanding, good, requires improvement and inadequate, Nottinghamshire Fire and Rescue Service was rated as follows:

Fire stations 
The service's headquarters and control room were located in Arnold, until relocating to a new building in 2022, achieving co-occupancy with Nottinghamshire Police in a £18.5million building project at Burntstump Country Park.

The service development centre in Ollerton provides firefighting training,
and drivers are trained to use blue lights at Highfields fire station in Beeston.

The service's fire stations are crewed by wholetime firefighters, on-call retained firefighters, or a mixture of both.

See also
List of British firefighters killed in the line of duty

References

External links

Nottinghamshire Fire and Rescue Service at HMICFRS

Fire and rescue services of England
Organisations based in Nottinghamshire
Nottingham
Organizations established in 1948